Wendy Rose (born May 8, 1948) is a Hopi/Miwok writer. Having grown up in an environment which placed little emphasis on both her Native American and white background, much of her verse deals with her search for her personal identity. She is also an anthropologist, artist, and social scientist.

Biography 
Also known under her pseudonym Chiron Khanshendel, Wendy Rose is a poet, nonfiction writer, artist, educator, and anthropologist. As a blend of all of these things, Rose rejects marginalization and categorization, but she is best known for her work as an American Indian poet.

Early life
Wendy Rose was born Bronwen Elizabeth Edwards on May 7, 1948, in Oakland, California. Though she is of Hopi and Miwok ancestry, Rose was raised in a predominantly white community in San Francisco. Growing up in an urban environment far removed from reservation life and Native American relations gave her little to no access to her native roots as a child. A theme at the forefront of her poetry, she comes from a mixed-blood family. Though her father is a full-blood Hopi, Rose was denied membership in her father's tribe because ancestry is determined matrilineally. Her mother was partly Miwok, but refused to acknowledge her American Indian heritage (instead she acknowledged her European ancestry including English, Scottish, Irish, and German extraction).

She began making her own path as a young woman when she dropped out of high school to go to San Francisco and join the American Indian Movement (AIM) and took part in the protest occupation of Alcatraz. During this time, Rose spent time coming to terms with her ethnicity, gender, and an Indian's place in the world.

College years
From 1966 to 1980, she began a new scholastic endeavor where she was enrolled in multiple colleges. First she attended Cabrillo College and Contra Costa Junior College. Then in 1974, Rose enrolled at the University of California, Berkeley. While attending the university in 1976 she married Arthur Murata and earned her B.A. in anthropology in that same year. Two years later she got her M.A. in 1978 and enrolled in the doctoral program. During this period of her life, Rose published five volumes of poetry and completed her Ph.D. in anthropology.

Professional career 
Besides the roles already mentioned of poet, historian, painter, illustrator, and anthropologist, Wendy Rose is also a teacher, researcher, consultant, editor, panelist, bibliographer, and advisor. 
	
Once she had returned to her schooling, Rose did not leave the world of academia again and went on to teach Native American and Ethnic studies first at the University of California, Berkeley from 1979 to 1983, then California State University, Fresno from 1983 to 1984 and finally at her current position in Fresno City College in 1984 where she is the Coordinator of the American Indian Studies Program and edited the American Indian Quarterly. Rose is a member of the American Federation of Teachers and has served as a facilitator for the Association of Non-Federally Recognized California Tribes. In addition, she also serves on the Modern Languages Association Commission on Languages and Literatures of America, Smithsonian Native Writers’ Series, Women's Literature Project of Oxford University Press, and Coordination Council of Literary Magazines.

Themes

Major themes
Some of the major themes explored in Wendy Rose's works are themes relating to the Native American experience (both specifically her own and also more broadly applied to other cultures of marginalization): colonialism, imperialism, dependency, nostalgia for the old ways, reverence for grandparents, resentment for conditions of the present, plight of reservation and urban Indians, sense of hopelessness, the power of the trickster, feminism as synonymous with heritage, deadly compromise, symbolism of all that has been lost (such as land), tension between the desire to retrieve the past and the inevitability of change, arrogance of white people, problems of half-breeds (or mixed-bloods).

Of course there are other themes, many of which are related back to her life as an anthropologist. Though she commonly shies away from her career as an anthropologist, constantly stating that she isn't really one of them (as she does in "Neon Scars" and her piece on whiteshamanism), the reader is constantly reminded of her involvement in history and science through the poetry's imagery and historical epigraphs.

Whiteshamanism
While any of these could be discussed at length, one of the most prevalent themes Wendy Rose employs, which ties together many of the other more obscure themes, is the concept vividly expressed in the poem "For the White poets who would be Indian" (discussed below) known as “whiteshamanism.”

Whiteshamanism is a term coined by the Cherokee critic, Geary Hobson, which he defined to be “the apparently growing number of small-press poets of generally white, Euro-Christian American background, who in their poems assume the persona of the shaman, usually in the guise of an American Indian medicine man. To be a poet is simply not enough; they must claim a power from higher sources.”

Both Hobson and Rose see this whiteshamanism as a modern sort of cultural imperialism. In her discourse on whiteshamanism, "Just What’s All This Fuss About Whiteshamanism Anyway?", Rose compares a white man with no real blood connection to Native Americans calling himself a shaman to a man claiming to be a Rabbi who isn't Jewish.

Native Americans view the whiteshaman with a mix of humor and contempt. It is not just the simple act of going outside their culture that is upsetting to Native Americans, but that they are misrepresenting the true Indian culture (their images are shadows of the true Indian style). Rose is opposed to the idea that through reading and hearing about Indian culture anyone can simply claim to be a spokesperson for the Native American experience.

As she puts it, “The problem with 'whiteshamans' is one of integrity and intent, not of topic, style, interest, or experimentation.” Rose has no problem with other races writing about Native Americans and their history, so long as it is written from their perspective and not from a falsely manufactured “whiteshaman” persona who simply asserts that they have the authority to talk about and understand the Native American experience.

In the introduction of her retrospective collection Bone Dance (1994), she states that, "the personal is political." As scholar David Perron so eloquently puts it:  “We come to understand that the diversity of Rose's poetry is not about distinctions, but about wholeness. Her contempt for the "whiteshaman" is out of the lack of wholeness which they represent, a wholeness which she has struggled to define in herself and her work. As she was struggling to find her identity within her mixed lineage and culture, using poetry to express herself, the "whiteshaman" simply stole from her culture. As her poetry bespeaks the position of injustice, the "whiteshaman" spoke from a privileged position. Thus, as difficult as it is to summarize the works of Wendy Rose, her writings on "whiteshamanism" bring together different strands of themes that appear throughout her poetry.”

Selected works (poetry analysis)

"Truganinny"
Probably her most well-known and written about poem, "Truganinny" is an example of Rose reaching out beyond the Native American experience and expanding it to the identity struggle experienced by other “half-breeds” or “outcasts” in other races.

The epigraph which is the jumping off point for the poem tells the story of Truganinny, the last Tasmanian, who saw her husband, stuffed, mounted, and put on display. It was her dying wish that her body not also be subjected to those indignities after death. Nevertheless, her dying wish was ignored and she too was put on display for over 80 years.

The poem allows the reader to experience this, her dying wish, in a very personal and powerful way as she entreats us to come in close and listen to what she has to say like a loved one and a confidence. Yet the reader is struck by the fact that even as we read her final request, we know it goes un-honored. This has a further social implication on the silencing of marginalized cultures and, additionally, women.

"For the White Poets who would be Indian"
This poem is directly related to the theme of “whiteshamanism” (discussed above) and based in Rose's personal indignation toward non-Native Americans who claim to understand the Native American experience. Rose takes the firm stance that it is not possible to understand something that one is not a part of. She uses powerful images associated with native traditions and mentions them in a flippant matter, practically throwing each image out (painted faces, doeskin, etc.) and  reflecting the way in which white Americans believe they can simply put on moccasins, walk in them for a time, and completely understand what it means to be an Indian. She uses sarcasm and irony in the poem.

While many other poems of this kind can come off preachy and offensive, Rose's poem delivers a message and conveys her obvious emotional stake in the matter while at the same time managing to not come off as overly-emotional sermonizing. In short, this poem is Rose's explanation of the hypocrisy of the “whiteshaman.”

"I Expected My Skin and My Blood to Ripen"
In no other poem does Rose manage of fuse inner turmoil and violence to make beauty so expertly as she does in "I Expected My Skin and My Blood to Ripen". Interweaving war and peace, Rose brings the victims at wounded knee back to life again so we, the reader, and witness the items they owned being stripped from their bodies along with their flesh and their dignity.

The poem starts with a passage about Wounded Knee about the “burial” of the bodies in a ditch as their items and possessions are sold off as art. The poem reflects this irony of valuing items over human life (as another of her poems reacts to the idea of Indian skeletons for cash).

Some of the most powerful images are of her as fallen fruit, full of juice and pulp and flesh who (like those Indians who were thrown into the ditch) is peeled, tasted, and discarded.

She talks of no future and no past as bayonets spear babies and beads are given away. The image of the frozen feat is reminiscent of the trail – that long journey where the Indians are all forced together, pulled apart, and then some were left behind; they were just seen as cattle (little more than flesh).

The poem also contains an example of the theme of raping Indian women, which is immediately followed by the image of a mother eating her child to save her from the world because there's “not enough magic” to stop the bullets. Their faith and traditions can't stop the oppression.

"Notes on a Conspiracy"
The poem "Notes on a Conspiracy" is a powerful poem, which begins with an excerpt about 40 something excavated skulls. The poem centers around the theme of white colonization.

It begins with the image of “the antelope’s dream” and her “eyes open for the great old visions / of the cougar and bear, but with rattlesnake / as I pass and listen to her song.” The dream vision invokes images of traditional Indian culture, which is further strengthened by the relation of the dream vision to animals (closely associated with older Indian traditions) and again by the theme of song.

She mentions Extinction of her people like a species wiped out. Then she gets more explicitly into the denouncing of colonialism and (specifically) Manifest Destiny. She directly ties the colonizers to today's white America by calling them the skullmongers who are excavating the skulls of the dead Indians. Her poetry sarcastically talks about how the colonials thought they had earned the right to the land because they traveled over the sea. The Indians believed that the Americans should have come over bearing gifts, but instead came only talking of land and money.

Then she asks where the strengths of old are? Where are the dances? It seems the only song now left is in her poetry!

“They blame us for their guilt. They say we are a privileged few. They say we gamble too much.” The way these lines are written reflect their meaning and make you feel like you're being told: “they blame... they say... they say... etc.” This idea of shifting the blame for what happened to the Indians on the Indians is common and despicable. It reflects the idea of the colonizers giving (“gifting”) land to the Indians as though they weren't theirs in the first place. Then they say that the Indians are so privileged, but what privileges do they have when they are constantly pre-judged for things like drinking and gambling?

“...and now the scientist wonders at the bullet he lifts from the small soft place where my daughter sleeps.” Then she ends by tying all these images associated with the skulls back to the present by saying that the scientists’ findings aren't ancient history, but still have a direct impact on these people and their children.

Critical reception

Content
Wendy Rose has been one of the leading voices in resurgent Native American poetry for the past quarter of a century.

In an interview with Joseph Bruchac, she told him that she sees her task as “storykeeper” as she chronicles the sufferings of displaced peoples and biracial outcasts worldwide in addition to treating ecological and feminist issues.

Wendy Rose's work is deeply rooted in ethnography and the living myths of Indian peoples. Noted for verse detailing her search for tribal and personal identity, much of Rose's poetry examines the experiences of mixed-blood Native Americans estranged from both native and white societies. This stems from her own mixed heritage and search for identity. Rose herself has said, “Everything I write is fundamentally autobiographical, no mater what style or topic.” Yet unlike many current and conventional white poets, her poems go beyond self-analysis to focus on others caught between cultures like herself.

At the same time, diversity is also apparent and expressed through multiple perspectives and covering a broad range of universally human experiences.

In her introduction to Bone Dance, she tells us, “I have often been identified as a ‘protest poet,’ and although something in me frowns at being so neatly categorized, that is largely the truth.” A huge element of her poetry is political, which is also unsurprising knowing her involvement in AIM and other Native American movements. As she puts it, “because the political is personal” it becomes a part of the poetry, whether intentionally so or not.

Knowing her background in anthropology and various Native American organizations, it is not surprising that the most prevalent image in her poetry are bones. In her poetry, the image of battered bone is the direct link to native American sense of self. The bones of dead Indians almost form the words on the page and are the spine holding together each of her volumes of poetry. Stemming from her work with anthropology, she writes about bones auctioned, objects sold, and bodies stuffed for our edification in a museum display. Those dead Indians both form the phantoms that haunt her poetry and at the same time are given new life and the chance to speak out in her poetry.

But perhaps the most incredible element Rose's poetry is her ability to capture the hard truth behind the Native American experience and make it accessible to non-Native readers.

Form
Her style is powerfully evocative and spare and she employs mostly free verse (though aware of other forms). Though for the most part she is a lyric poet, traces of oral Indian tradition and the chant come through in her poetry. As she says in her introduction to Bone Dance, “if the words cannot be sung in the genuine language of the old way, they must be written.”

Another stylistic choice she makes is frequently beginning with an epigraph from the written records of the long assault on Native Peoples. Often she uses this epigraph from the historical, archeological world, as a jumping off point for her poetry which is narrated by a Native-identified voice, allowing for the reader to draw the connection between the two. This juxtaposition brings the “historical artifact” of bone or cloth to life and we can see the skin being literally ripped away with the language of the poetry and giving the casual observer a real vision of that object.

Her use of basic, everyday language is a point of contention. At first it can come across as simple, but that simplicity of language allows for a greater range of emotion to come out in her work. She explains this in her introduction to Bone Dance: “I never felt that it was enough to display agility with words or clever turns of phrase. I believe that inaccessible poetry does not work. If the listener must take a special class in how to appreciate it, then the poem has failed. I hold myself to that standard and try to remember that 'ordinary' language contains all of the imagery and beauty needed by the poem.”

Works

Introduction
Each of Wendy Rose's collections of poetry represent a different phase in her life and a different set of experiences and can be linked to different points in her life which influenced each volume in a unique way.

Selected bibliography
Itch Like Crazy (2002) -- this work deals with buried secrets of personal, family, and American history in relation to the human experience.
Bone Dance: New and Selected Poems, 1965-1992 (1994) -- a collection of some of her works from all of her different collections focusing on the condition of the “halfbreed.”
Now Poof She Is Gone (1994) -- a collection of more of her private and personal poems with a common theme of feminine identity.
Going to War With All My Relations (1993) -- this volume documents her thirty-some years of activities with the Fourth World Movement.
The Halfbreed Chronicles & Other Poems (1985)—this volume mixes the pain of marginalization with the desire for wholeness in her stories of oppression mixed with beauty.
What Happened When the Hopi Hit New York (1982) -- this volume is her search for tribal and personal history in a modern and foreign world.
Lost Copper (1980) -- the central focus is on Roses’ feelings of marginalization and her desire to be part of the native community and blended identity.
Aboriginal Tattooing in California (1979)
Builder Kachina: A Home-Going Cycle (1979) -- a journey from her mother's land to her father's in search of tribal identity.
Academic Squaw: Reports to the World from the Ivory Tower (1977) -- her ironic title reflects on the (un)reality of her experience as an American Indian in the white university system (as well as which beginning a theme of scholar and subject).
Long Division: A Tribal History (1976)
Hopi Roadrunner Dancing (1973) -- her first major work deals with issues which arose with her involvement in AIM as well as personal struggles with cultural identity.

Other works
Just What's All This Fuss about Whiteshamanism, Anyway? Coyote Was Here (1984)
Neon Scars, I Tell You Now (1987)
The Great Pretenders: Further Reflections on Whiteshamanism, The State of Native America: Genocide, Colonization and Resistance (1992)
For Some It's a Time of Mourning, Without Discovery (1992)

See also
List of writers from peoples indigenous to the Americas
Native American Studies

Sources
"American Poets of the 20th Century: Wendy Rose", URL accessed 04/17/08
Furlong-Bolliger, Susan. "Wendy Rose." Guide to Literary Masters and Their Works. 17 April 2008
Hamilton, Amy T. "Remembering Migration and Removal, American Indian Women's Poetry." Rocky Mountain Review of Language and Literature. 61 (2007): 9 pars. 17 April 2008.
Hunter, Carol. "A MELUS Interview: Wendy Rose." MELUS. 10 (1983) 17 April 2008. 
Marek, Jayne. "Rose, Wendy." Continuum Encyclopedia of American Literature, Letter R. (1948): 2/3 pars. 17 April 2008.
"Modern American Poetry: Wendy Rose", URL accessed 04/17/08
"Native American Authors Project, Wendy Rose , 1948-", URL accessed 07/25/07
 
Saucerman, James R. "Wendy Rose: Searching Through Shards, Creating Life" Wíčazo Ša Review. 5 (1989) 17 April 2008. 
Sawhney, Brajesh. "That the People Might Live: Strategies of Survival in Contemporary Native American Fiction." ICFAI Journal of English Studies. 3 (2008) 17 April 2008.
"VG: Artist Biography: Rose, Wendy", URL accessed 04/17/08
"Wendy Rose Criticism", URL accessed 04/17/08

References

1948 births
Living people
Miwok people
Cabrillo College alumni
Contra Costa College alumni
University of California, Berkeley alumni
American anthropologists
American women anthropologists
Hopi people
Fresno City College faculty
Native American poets
Native American women writers
American women poets
Writers from Oakland, California
American women academics
20th-century Native Americans
21st-century Native Americans
20th-century Native American women
21st-century Native American women